Adriano Pellegrino (born 9 June 1984) is an Australian footballer who plays as a midfielder for Adelaide City.

Biography

Club career
Pellegrino was with the NSL club Adelaide City between 2000 and 2003 before joining Adelaide United for the 2003-2004 NSL season.

In 2005, he signed for Greek club Panachaiki before returning to Australia to play for South Australian Super League club Adelaide City in 2007.

In 2008, he signed for A-League club Perth Glory FC. Adriano was voted the 2008/09 Most Glorious Player by his peers, garnering twenty three points for his performances throughout the season, eight points clear of runner up, Jamie Harnwell. During that campaign he scored a sensational goal against Melbourne in Round 14 which was nominated for goal of the year.

In January 2010 he was linked to Scottish club Celtic. However, with the arrival of the Paul Slane to Celtic, Adriano decided to stay at Perth Glory.

On 15 April 2011 he signed for A-League outfit Central Coast Mariners. He made his debut and scored in a pre season friendly 3-0 win against Blacktown City.He then went on to win the A-League title with the Mariners and play Asian Champions league for the Mariners.

He signed for Thai club Udon Thani F.C. in January 2015.

International career
Pellegrino represented Australia as a member of the U-20 team that qualified for the 2003 FIFA World Youth Championship.

References

External links
 Perth Glory profile

1984 births
Living people
Australian people of Italian descent
Australian soccer players
Australia youth international soccer players
Australia under-20 international soccer players
Australian expatriate soccer players
A-League Men players
FFSA Super League players
National Premier Leagues players
Adelaide City FC players
Adelaide United FC players
Panachaiki F.C. players
Perth Glory FC players
Central Coast Mariners FC players
Central Coast Mariners Academy players
Expatriate footballers in Cambodia
Phnom Penh Crown FC players
Adriano Pellegrino
Expatriate footballers in Thailand
FC Tulsa players
USL Championship players
North Eastern MetroStars SC players
Association football midfielders